Fuchsia denticulata is a shrub in the family Onagraceae, native to Bolivia and Peru.

References

External links
 
 

denticulata
Flora of Bolivia
Flora of Peru